The 1976 Japan rugby union tour of Europe was a series of ten matches played by the Japan national rugby union team in the United Kingdom and Italy in September and October 1976. Japan won three and lost seven of their ten matches. They lost all three of the matches against international representative teams; a Scottish XV, England under-23 and Italy.

Matches 
Scores and results list Japan's points tally first.

References

Japan rugby union tour
Japan national rugby union team tours
Rugby union tours of Wales
Rugby union tours of Italy
Rugby union tours of England
Rugby union tours of Scotland
tour
tour
tour
tour
Japan Rugby Union Tour of Europe
Japan Rugby Union Tour of Europe